Christian Friedrich Freyer (25 August 1794, Wassertrüdingen – 11 November 1885, Augsburg) was a German entomologist mainly interested in Lepidoptera.

References 

 Dierl, W. & Hausmann, A. 1992: Sammling Die Sektion Lepidoptera der Zoologischen Staatssammlung München. Spixiana Suppl. 17 101–107.

External links 
 

19th-century German zoologists
1794 births
1885 deaths
German lepidopterists
People from Ansbach (district)